Gmina Wysokie is a rural gmina (administrative district) in Lublin County, Lublin Voivodeship, in eastern Poland.

Villages
Gmina Wysokie contains the villages and settlements of Antoniówka, Biskupie, Biskupie-Kolonia, Cegielnia, Dragany, Giełczew, Giełczew-Doły, Guzówka, Jabłonowo, Kajetanów, Łosień, Nowy Dwór, Nowy Maciejów, Radomirka, Rezerwa, Słupeczno, Spławy, Stary Maciejów, Stolnikowizna, Wysokie and Zabłocie.

Neighbouring gminas
Gmina Wysokie is bordered by the gminas of Bychawa, Krzczonów, Turobin, Zakrzew and Żółkiewka.

References

Wysokie
Lublin County